Tamagotchi is a handheld digital pet created in Japan.

Tamagotchi may also refer to:

 Tamagotchi! (TV series), by Jōji Shimura
 "Tamagotchi" (Omar Apollo song)
 "Tamagotchi" (Kigurumi song)
 "Tamagotchi", a song by Putochinomaricón, Chenta Tsai and GFOTY

See also
 "Tamagochi", a song by Lola Índigo from La niña